Mildiani is a Georgian family name from the Svaneti region in north-western Georgia.

The Mildiani family name comes from these towns of Svaneti: Becho, Etseri, Lakhamula, Mestia, Tskhumari, Tchuberi. Presently, there are 154 Mildiani family names in Georgia.

References

Georgian-language surnames